Lou Albano (1933–2009), popularly known as "Captain Lou", was an Italian-born American professional wrestler, wrestling manager and actor

Captain Lou may also refer to:

 "Captain Lou", a song by NRBQ from the album Lou and the Q, about Albano
 "Captain Lou", a song by Kimya Dawson from the album Thunder Thighs, also about Albano
 "Captain Lou's Corner", an interview segment hosted by Lou Albano on the UWF Fury Hour program from 1990 to 1991

See also
 Captain Louie, a musical by Stephen Schwartz
 Louis Nolan (1818–1854), a captain in the British Army
 Captain Louis Peugnet House, a farmhouse in Cape Vincent, New York, listed on the National Register of Historic Places